Kalinovka is a rural locality (a selo) and the administrative center of Kalinovsky Selsoviet, Tarumovsky District, Republic of Dagestan, Russia. The population was 1,805 as of 2010. There are 16 streets.

Geography 
Kalinovka is located 16 km south of Tarumovka (the district's administrative centre) by road. Karabagly is the nearest rural locality.

References 

Rural localities in Tarumovsky District